is a Japanese book retailer.

Libro is the Spanish word for "book"

References

External links

 Libro (Japanese)

Retail companies based in Tokyo